April 16 - Eastern Orthodox liturgical calendar - April 18

All fixed commemorations below are observed on April 30 by Eastern Orthodox Churches on the Old Calendar.

For April 17th, Orthodox Churches on the Old Calendar commemorate the Saints listed on April 4.

Saints

 Hieromartyr Anicetus, Pope of Rome (166)
 Martyr Adrian of Corinth, in Persia (251)
 Hieromartyr Symeon (Shemon Bar Sabbae), Bishop in Persia, and those with him (341):
 Hieromartyrs Abdechalas and Ananias, priests; 
 Martyrs Chusdazat (Usphazanes) and Azat, the eunuchs; 
 Fusicus, the dignitary and Ascitrea, his daughter, and 1,150 (or 1,250 or 1,515) others.
 Saint Acacius II, Bishop of Melitene (435)April 30 / April 17. Holy Trinity Russian Orthodox Church (A parish of the Patriarchate of Moscow).  (see also: April 18)
 Saint Agapitus I, Pope of Rome (536)Great Synaxaristes:  Ὁ Ἅγιος Ἀγαπητὸς πάπας Ρώμης. 17 Απριλίου. Μεγασ Συναξαριστησ.  (see also: September 20; April 22 - West)
 Saint Ephraim the Great, Bishop of Atsquri, Georgia (9th century)Great Synaxaristes:  Ὁ Ἅγιος Ἐφραὶμ ὁ Μεγάλος. 17 Απριλίου. Μεγασ Συναξαριστησ.  (see also: April 15)

Pre-Schism Western saints

 Martyrs Mappalicus and Companions, in Carthage under Decius (250)
 Martyrs Fortunatus and Marcian.
 Saint Innocent of Tortona, Bishop of Tortona and Confessor (350)
 Saint Pantagathus, a courtier who later became Bishop of Vienne in France (540)
 Saint Villicus, a very virtuous Bishop of Metz in France 543-568 (568)
 Monk-martyr Donnán of Eigg and those with him, in Scotland (618)Rev. Sabine Baring-Gould (M.A.). "S. Domnan and Comp., MM. (about A.D. 600.)." In: The Lives of the Saints. Volume the Fourth: April. London: John C. Nimmo, 1897. p. 220.
 Saint Landericus (Landry of Metz), Bishop of Meaux, then Abbot of Soignies (7th century)Very Rev. John O'Hanlon. "Article VII.—St. Landricus, or Landry, Bishop of Meaux, or Metz, France. [Seventh Century]." In: Lives of the Irish Saints: With Special Festivals, and the Commemorations of Holy Persons. Vol. IV. Dublin, 1875. pp. 198-201.
 Saint Wando (Vando), monk and Abbot of Fontenelle Abbey in France (c. 756)
 Martyrs Isidore, Elias and Paul of Cordoba, Spain, by the Moors (856) (see also: April 30)

Post-Schism Orthodox saints

 Venerable Zosimas of Solovki (1478)Great Synaxaristes:  Ὁ Ὅσιος Ζωσιμᾶς. 17 Απριλίου. Μεγασ Συναξαριστησ.
 Saint Macarios (Notaras) of Corinth (1805)Great Synaxaristes:  Ὁ Ἅγιος Μακάριος Ἀρχιεπίσκοπος Κορίνθου. 17 Απριλίου. Μεγασ Συναξαριστησ.
 Venerable Saints Apostolos (1846) and Theocharis (1829), brothers, of Arta.
 Venerable Paisius, Fool-for-Christ, of the Kiev Caves (1893)Great Synaxaristes:  Ὁ Ὅσιος Παΐσιος ὁ διὰ Χριστὸν Σαλός. 17 Απριλίου. Μεγασ Συναξαριστησ.

New martyrs and confessors

 New Hieromartyr John Prigorovsky of Krasnoyarsk, Priest (1918)The Autonomous Orthodox Metropolia of Western Europe and the Americas. St. Hilarion Calendar of Saints for the year of our Lord 2004. St. Hilarion Press (Austin, TX). p. 29.
 New Hieromartyr Michael Novitsky, Confessor, Archpriest, of Uzda, Belorussia (1935)
 New Hieromartyr Theodore Nedosekin of Moscow, Priest (1942)

Other commemorations

 Uncovering of the relics (1641) of St. Alexander of Svir, founder of Svir Monastery (1533)Great Synaxaristes:  Μετακομιδὴ Τιμίων Λειψάνων Ὁσίου Ἀλεξάνδρου τοῦ ἐκ Ρωσίας. 17 Απριλίου. Μεγασ Συναξαριστησ.
 Repose of Hiero-schema-monk Constantine of Ekaterinburg (1960) 

Icon gallery

Notes

References

Sources
 April 17 / April 30. Orthodox Calendar (pravoslavie.ru).
 April 30 / April 17. Holy Trinity Russian Orthodox Church (A parish of the Patriarchate of Moscow).
 April 17. OCA - The Lives of the Saints.
 The Autonomous Orthodox Metropolia of Western Europe and the Americas. St. Hilarion Calendar of Saints for the year of our Lord 2004. St. Hilarion Press (Austin, TX). p. 29.
 April 17. Latin Saints of the Orthodox Patriarchate of Rome.
 The Roman Martyrology. Transl. by the Archbishop of Baltimore. Last Edition, According to the Copy Printed at Rome in 1914. Revised Edition, with the Imprimatur of His Eminence Cardinal Gibbons. Baltimore: John Murphy Company, 1916. p. 108.Greek Sources Great Synaxaristes:  17 Απριλίου. Μεγασ Συναξαριστησ.
  Συναξαριστής. 17 Απριλίου. ecclesia.gr. (H Εκκλησια Τησ Ελλαδοσ). Russian Sources'''
  30 апреля (17 апреля). Православная Энциклопедия под редакцией Патриарха Московского и всея Руси Кирилла (электронная версия). (Orthodox Encyclopedia - Pravenc.ru).
  17 апреля (ст.ст.) 30 апреля 2013 (нов. ст.). Русская Православная Церковь Отдел внешних церковных связей.

April in the Eastern Orthodox calendar